Ripley is a village and civil parish in North Yorkshire in England, a few miles north of Harrogate on the A61 road towards Ripon. The village name derives from Old English and is believed to mean wood of the Hrype or Ripon people. Ripley was historically part of the West Riding of Yorkshire until 1974.

History

The village and castle are privately owned. A castle dating from the 15th century, Ripley Castle, has been the home of the Ingilby family for 700 years. The present owner is Sir Thomas Ingilby, 6th Baronet (see Ingilby Baronets), the 28th generation. The castle, which has a priest hole, is open for public tours. The landscaped castle grounds and ornamental lakes are also open to the public.

Ripley has 55 Grade II Listed buildings and two that are Grade I Listed: Ripley Castle (open to tourists and for events prior to the COVID-19 pandemic) and the "Gatehouse Approximately 80 Metres South of Ripley Castle".

A 19th century Ingilby tore down the old village, except for the castle and the church, and modelled it after an Alsatian village with Ripley Town Hall designed in the style of a French "hôtel de ville".

In 2014, the Tour de France came past Ripley on its way to Harrogate. There is a cycle path between Ripley and Harrogate called the Nidderdale Greenway which is part of the National Cycle Route 67.

In March 2017, the village was named number 17 out of the 20 Best Villages in Britain to live in (one of only two in the North of England). The listing describes it as a popular satellite village of Harrogate and that families from London having been moving here and commuting to London twice-weekly.

See also
Ripley Group—Ripley Fine Foods Limited, Ripley Traditional Sweet Company, The World Famous Ripley Ice Cream and Ripley Store

References

External links

 Ripley Castle
 Ingilby History Site

Civil parishes in North Yorkshire
Villages in North Yorkshire